The 2010 WCHA Men's Ice Hockey Tournament was played between March 12 and March 20, 2010 at five conference arenas and the Xcel Energy Center in St. Paul, Minnesota. North Dakota received the Broadmoor Trophy as the tournament's champions, and was awarded the Western Collegiate Hockey Association's automatic bid to the 2010 NCAA Division I Men's Ice Hockey Tournament.

Format
The first round of the postseason tournament featured a best-of-three games format. All ten conference teams participated in the tournament. Teams were seeded No. 1 through No. 10 according to their final conference standing, with a tiebreaker system used to seed teams with an identical number of points accumulated. The top five seeded teams each earned home ice and host one of the lower seeded teams.

The winners of the first round series advanced to the Xcel Energy Center for the WCHA Final Five, the collective name for the quarterfinal, semifinal, and championship rounds. The Final Five used a single-elimination format. Teams were re-seeded No. 1 through No. 5 according to the final regular season conference standings, with the top three teams automatically advancing to the semifinals.

Conference standings
Note: GP = Games played; W = Wins; L = Losses; T = Ties; PTS = Points; GF = Goals For; GA = Goals Against

Bracket
Teams are reseeded after the first round

Note: * denotes overtime periods

First round

(1) Denver vs. (10) Michigan Tech

(2) Wisconsin vs. (9) Alaska-Anchorage

(3) St. Cloud State vs. (8) Minnesota State

(4) North Dakota vs. (7) Minnesota

(5) Minnesota-Duluth vs. (6) Colorado College

Quarterfinal

(4) North Dakota vs. (5) Minnesota-Duluth

Semifinals

(1) Denver vs. (4) North Dakota

(2) Wisconsin vs. (3) St. Cloud State

Third place

(2) Wisconsin vs. (1) Denver

Championship

(3) St. Cloud State vs. (4) North Dakota

Tournament awards

All-Tournament Team
F Derrick Lapoint (North Dakota)
F Tony Mosey (St. Cloud State)
F Chris VandeVelde (North Dakota)
D Ben Blood (North Dakota)
D Garrett Raboin (St. Cloud State)
G Brad Eidsness (North Dakota)

MVP
Evan Trupp, (North Dakota)

References

External links
Western Collegiate Hockey Association

Wcha Men's Ice Hockey Tournament
WCHA Men's Ice Hockey Tournament